Intrinsic is the second studio album by American progressive metal band The Contortionist, released through eOne Music/Good Fight Entertainment on July 17, 2012. This is the band's last release with vocalist/keyboardist Jonathan Carpenter and bassist Christopher Tilley.

The album sold 3,600 copies in its first week, reaching no. 125 on the Billboard 200 chart.

Release and promotion 
On May 30, 2012, the band revealed the album title, track-listing, and artwork; they also announced various pre-order bundles. The first single, "Holomovement", was released on June 11, 2012. The band also released an animated video to go with the premiere. On July 16, the band released their very first music video for the song "Causality". A music video was released for "Dreaming Schematics" on December 3. The videos share a similar concept - they act as a part 1 and part 2; both were produced by KOTK Productions.

On October 3, 2012, vocalist/keyboardist Jonathan Carpenter released a track-by-track guide for each of the album's songs through Metal Sucks.

Concept 
Jonathan Carpenter commented:

Track listing

Personnel 
The Contortionist
 Jonathan Carpenter — vocals, keyboards
 Robby Baca — guitar
 Cameron Maynard — guitar
 Joey Baca — drums
 Christopher Tilley — bass

Production
Produced by Eyal Levi, Jason Suecof & Eric Guenther
Engineered & mixed by Eyal Levi & Jason Suecof
Mastered by Alan Douches, @ West West Side Music, New York
Synthesizer by Eric Guenther
Pro-Tools by John Douglass
Management by Jason (Strong Management)
Publicity by Bill Meis (Entone Group)
Booking by Cody Delong (The Kenmore Agency)

Charts

References

External links
"Causality" music video on YouTube
"Dreaming Schematics" music video on YouTube

2012 albums
The Contortionist albums
E1 Music albums
Albums produced by Jason Suecof